Klabautamann is a German black metal band, with folk and progressive influences. "Klabautamann" is another way of saying "Klabautermann", a goblin who can predict shipwrecks.

Band history

The band was formed by Tim Steffens and Florian Toyka in 1998 in Meckenheim, North Rhine-Westphalia. After two demo-recordings the band finished their debut album, Our Journey through the Woods, in summer 2003. This was in collaboration with Marlon Drescher (session drums) and Armin Rave (mix and mastering). In February 2005 the second album, Der Ort, was released on Heavy Horses Records. This time the CD was completely produced by the band. There were again some other people involved: Patrick Schröder (session drums), Isabel Jasse and Stefan Horn (guest vocals), Julia Tomaschitz and Christian Kolf (some lyrics). In June 2009 their third album, Merkur, was released in CD format by the band's own label, Zeitgeister Music. Heavy Horses Records released a vinyl version of 500 units.

On 21 November 2011 the band released their fourth album, Old Chamber, which the band saw as a departure from their progressive/black metal album with jazz/lounge influences, Merkur. The sound has been described as back "into the realms of pure frozen Black Metal atmosphere once again." It was followed by Smaragd, released on 6 June 2017, again by Zeitgeister Music.

Discography

 Opus Obscoenum Infernalis (1998, demo)
 Gott Schenkt Gift (2000, demo)
 Our Journey through the Woods (2003, full-length)
 Der Ort (2005, full-length)
 Klabautamann (2007, EP)
 Merkur (2009, full-length)
 The Old Chamber (2011, full-length)
 Smaragd (2017, full-length)

Lineup 
Tim Steffens (1998-) - guitars, bass guitar, vocals 
Florian Toyka (1998-2019) - guitars, bass guitar

References

External links
Klabautamann's Official Homepage
interview on avantgarde-metal.com, IX/2009

German heavy metal musical groups